Anna Clarén (born 1972) is a Swedish photographer and educator.

Holding (2006) won Best Photobook in the Swedish Photo Book Prize. She has had solo exhibitions at The House of Culture and Fotografiska in Stockholm, and at the Musée des Beaux-Arts de Caen in France. Clarén's work is held in the collection of Moderna Museet in Stockholm.

Early life and education
Clarén was born in 1972 in Valje, Sweden and grew up in Lund, Scania.

Life and work
Clarén worked as a photographer from 1997, including as a press photographer for Aftonbladet and Icakuriren, and making work for magazines and books. She now leads the Nordens Folkhögskola Biskops-Arnö, where she has been a head teacher since 2006.

Holding (2006) is a visual diary created over four months that "portrays the people and places in Clarén's immediate surroundings". It is included in Parr and Badger's The Photobook: A History, Volume III, where it is described as containing "portraits, interiors, still lifes and landscapes — that together seem to make up a mysterious narrative. The style is diffuse and the images high key, washed-out in colour and frequently blue-tinged, which suggests they have only one foot in reality, and that the narrative is raking through old memories, or is a dream."

With Close to Home (2013) Clarén "documented herself as pregnant, her children, and the people and surroundings close to her home."

When Everything Changed (2018) was made from the point her third child was diagnosed with autism; "we then follow the family and glimpse the different ways they deal with the situation", from 2013 to 2017.

Publications
Holding. Sweden: Journal, 2006. .
Puppy Love. Sweden: Journal, 2009. .
Close to Home. Stockholm: Max Ström, 2013. .
När allt förändrades / When Everything Changed
När allt förändrades. Stockholm: Max Ström, 2018. .
When Everything Changed. Stockholm: Max Ström, 2018. .

Exhibitions

Solo exhibitions
Holding, Musée des Beaux-Arts de Caen, Caen, France, 2008/9
Holding, The House of Culture, Stockholm, Sweden, 2008
When Everything Changed, Fotografiska, Stockholm, Sweden, 2018

Group exhibitions
A Way of Life: Swedish Photography from Christer Strömholm until Today, Moderna Museet Malmö, Malmö, Sweden, 2014; Moderna Museet, Stockholm, Sweden, 2014/15. With work by Christer Strömholm, Clarén, Martin Bogren, JH Engström, Kenneth Gustavsson, Gerry Johansson, Tuija Lindström, Anders Petersen, Inta Ruka, Gunnar Smoliansky, Lars Tunbjörk, and others.

Awards

Collections
Clarén's work is held in the following public collection:
Moderna Museet, Stockholm, Sweden: 12 prints (as of August 2021)

References

External links

21st-century Swedish photographers
People from Lund
Living people
1972 births
21st-century women photographers
21st-century Swedish women artists
Swedish women photographers